Susan "Susie" Silvey (born 17 September 1956), occasionally Suzie Silvey, is an English actress, dancer and model, active in the 1970s and 1980s.

Early life
Silvey attended the Harrow School of Art, where she studied ballet for five years, jazz and tap dancing for three years. She later was a dancer on Top of the Pops in the 1980s.

Career

Television work
Appearances include The Dick Emery Show (1980), Terry and June (1980), The Hitchhiker's Guide to the Galaxy (1981), Emery Presents: Legacy of Murder (1982), Smiley's People (1982), Jemima Shore Investigates (1983) and Never the Twain (1983).

Other television work includes the Stanley Baxter Show, the Kenny Everett Show, the Dave Allen Show, The Professionals, The Kelly Monteith Show, Cannon and Ball, Sorry!, Little and Large, Cuffy, The Two Ronnies, EastEnders, Harry Enfield's Television Programme, The Les Dawson Show, The Chinese Detective, The Late, Late Breakfast Show, The Bill and Rumpole of the Bailey.

Film work
Her film credits include roles in Come Play with Me (1977), The Playbirds (1978), The Stud (1978), The World Is Full of Married Men (1979), Can I Come Too? (1979), Sex with the Stars (1980), Xtro (1983), Fanny Hill (1983), Blue Ice (1992), Shining Through (1992) and Splitting Heirs (1993). She appeared in silhouette as a roller skater in the opening titles of Octopussy (1983). Silvey also appeared in music videos for Paul McCartney, the Cure and the Joe Cocker video for 'Civilized Man' (1984).

Present day
Today Silvey is on the Committee of the Celebrities Guild of Great Britain and is a member of the Heritage Foundation, which involve her arranging celebrity guests for fund-raising events and blue plaque unveiling. She was present at the unveiling of blue plaques to Jet Harris, Robin Gibb, and Morecambe and Wise unveiled at Teddington Studios in May 2013.

In August 2012 she appeared in an episode of Cash in the Attic with her daughter, Sarah Silvey-Fine. In November 2020 she appeared in Channel 5's documentary Dick Emery's Comedy Gold.

References

External links

Silvey on the British Film Institute website
Silvey on Aveleyman
Silvey on The Dick Emery Show - YouTube

1956 births
Living people
20th-century British dancers
20th-century English actresses
21st-century British dancers
21st-century English actresses
Actresses from London
English female dancers
English female models
English film actresses
English television actresses
Models from London